Kentucky Route 136 (KY 136) is a  state highway in Kentucky. It runs from KY 56 in Beech Grove west of Sebree to U.S. Route 231 (US 231) north of Hartford via Calhoun and Livermore.

Major intersections

References

0136
0136
0136